Wilkinsburg is a station on the East Busway, located in Wilkinsburg.

There is a large park and ride lot next to the station.

See also
 Pennsylvania Railroad Station-Wilkinsburg

References

Port Authority of Allegheny County stations
Transportation in Pittsburgh
Martin Luther King Jr. East Busway